'50s Gold (formerly The '50s on 5 or just The '50s) is a commercial-free, satellite radio station on Sirius XM Radio channel 72, as well as on Dish Network channel 6005.

From 2001 to 2008, the Program Director for XM's The '50s on 5 was Ken Smith, and its Music Director was Matt "the Cat" Baldassarri. Both men were dismissed from the channel in October 2008 following XM's merger with former rival Sirius. On November 12, 2008, The '50s on 5 was added to the Sirius platform, replacing the Sirius Gold channel.

Similar to the other decades-themed channels, '50s Gold attempts to recreate the feel of 1950s radio. It uses similar DJ habits, jingles, period slang, and news updates. The channel was also used for XM's annual Pop Music music chronology, IT. However, unlike most satellite radio stations which play songs solely from a specific decade, the lineup of songs on '50s Gold is mostly from 1954 to 1963, a decade that spans from the start of the rock and roll era to immediately before the British Invasion. 40s Junction carries the early 1950s playlist alongside the late 30s and 40s music.

In early 2014, Sirius removed the disc jockeys from The '50s on 5, and also from '90s on 9, in an apparent cost-cutting move. Pat St. John was one of the dismissed DJs.

As of 2020, 50s on 5 carries some limited hosted programming, including a show by Pat Boone, In the Key of Neil with Neil Sedaka, the terrestrially syndicated Cool Bobby B's Doo Wop Stop, and The Pink And Black Days with Alex Ward. 

In October 2021, SiriusXM announced that the station would move to channel 72 on the SiriusXM service on November 3, and that the station's name would simultaneously change to 50s Gold.

Core artists
Elvis Presley
Fats Domino
Chuck Berry
Ricky Nelson
Buddy holly
Everly Brothers
Little Richard
Perry Como
The Platters
Connie Francis
Jerry Lee Lewis

References

External links
 SiriusXM: '50s Gold

1950s in music
Sirius Satellite Radio channels
XM Satellite Radio channels
Sirius XM Radio channels
Radio stations established in 2001
Decades themed radio stations